Young Sherlock (Chinese: 少年神探狄仁杰) is a 2014 Chinese television series starring Bosco Wong as a young detective Di Renjie (best known in the west for the fictionalized Judge Dee stories). The series premiered on Zhejiang TV on 3 June 2014.

Synopsis
Young Sherlock tells of a series of thrilling and cryptic cases faced by 26-year-old protagonist Di Renjie (Bosco Wong). With him on his travels are his close friend Wang Yuanfang (Ma Tianyu), medical expert and love interest Li Wanqing (Stephy Qi), and childhood friend Tong Mengyao (Cindy Sun). Together, the four unravel various bizarre mysteries that take place during the Tang Dynasty.

Cast
 Bosco Wong as Di Renjie
 Qi Wei as Li Wanqing 
 Ma Tianyu as Wang Yuanfang
 Sun Xiaoxiao as Tong Mengyao
 Ruby Lin as Wu Meiniang
 Yuan Hong as Li Zhi
 Liang Yo-lin as Du Jingqiu
 Li Jiahang as Chu Shangyuan
 Hang Rui as Li Runnan 
 Sun Yaoqi as Wu Qianqian
 Reyizha Alimjan as Shenji
 Lee Li-chun as white-haired man
 Qiu Shuang as Erbao
 Shi Dasheng as Wang Youren
 Liu Yi as Zhangsun Wuji
 Liu Jun as Chu Suiliang
 Li Wenwen as Consort Xu
 Wang Zhifei as Xue Yong
 Zheng Xiaoning as Wang Bo
 Wu Jinyan as Li Qian

Soundtrack
 Opening theme song: Listen to the Wind Howl (聽風嘯) by Bosco Wong
 Ending theme song: Accompany you to the End of the World (陪你天涯) by Qi Wei
 Falling Flowers (落花) by Ma Tianyu
 Missing the Beauty (念紅顔) by Qiu Shuang & Sun Xiaoxiao

References

Television series set in the Tang dynasty
Judge Dee
Gong'an television series
2014 Chinese television series debuts
Television series by H&R Century Pictures
Cultural depictions of Wu Zetian
Cultural depictions of Di Renjie